The Pacific Coast League (PCL) is a Minor League Baseball league operating at the Triple-A level. It was founded in 1903 as circuit of six teams on the West Coast of the United States. After the cancellation of the 2020 season, the league was known as the Triple-A West in 2021 before reverting to the Pacific Coast League name in 2022. This list documents the PCL's top players and teams in particular statistical areas.

The mild climate of the West Coast, especially California, allowed the league to play longer seasons, sometimes starting in late February and ending as late as the beginning of December. Teams regularly played between 170 and 200 games in a season until the late 1950s. This abundance of games and playing time is one reason that a number of league records were set during the first half of the 20th century.

Table key

Career records
These are records of individual players with the best performance in particular statistical categories during a single season organized by vintage era (1903–1957) and modern era (1958–present).

Career batting

Career pitching

Career fielding

Individual single-season records
These are records of individual players with the best performance in particular statistical categories during a single season organized by vintage era (1903–1957) and modern era (1958–present).

Single-season batting

1903–1957

 No records available prior to 1940

1958–present

 Left field at Sacramento's Hughes Stadium was less than the  feet prescribed in Official Baseball Rule 1.04.

Single-season pitching

1903–1957

 No records available 1903, 1907–1909, 1911–1913
 No records available prior to 1914

1958–present

 Left field at Sacramento's Hughes Stadium was less than the  feet prescribed in Official Baseball Rule 1.04.

Team single-season records
These are records of individual players with the best performance in particular statistical categories during a single season organized by vintage era (1903–1957) and modern era (1958–present).

Single-season batting

1903–1957

 No records available prior to 1921
 No records available prior to 1939

1958–present

 Left field at Sacramento's Hughes Stadium was less than the  feet prescribed in Official Baseball Rule 1.04.

Single-season pitching

Single-season fielding

 No records available prior to 1940

References
Specific

General

Pacific Coast League
Pacific Coast League records
Pacific Coast League